The year 1978 in architecture involved some significant architectural events and new buildings.

Buildings and structures

Buildings
 Gehry House by Frank Gehry in Santa Monica, California.
 Sunshine 60 in Tokyo, Japan is completed.
 Reunion Tower in Dallas, Texas is completed.
 United Nations City in Vienna, Austria is completed.
 Comodoro Rivadavia Cathedral in Argentina is dedicated.
 London Borough of Camden low-rise high-density social housing schemes completed on Alexandra Road Estate (designed by Neave Brown in 1968) and Branch Hill (by Gordon Benson and Alan Forsyth).
 Commercial Street Housing in Perth, Scotland, designed by James Parr & Partners.
 Angoori Bagh Housing in Pakistan, designed by Yasmeen Lari, completed.
 Sanctuary of Meritxell, Andorra, designed by Ricardo Bofill Taller de Arquitectura, completed.
 Sheep Field Barn (sculpture gallery for Henry Moore Foundation), Perry Green, Hertfordshire, England, designed by Hawkins\Brown.

Events
 Herzog & de Meuron Architekten set up in Basel.
 Manfredi Nicoletti publishes L'ecosistema urbano (The Urban ecosystem) - a term that he himself has coined.

Awards
AIA Gold Medal – Philip Johnson
Alvar Aalto Medal – James Stirling (architect)
Architecture Firm Award – Harry Weese & Associates
Grand prix national de l'architecture – Jean Renaudie
RAIA Gold Medal – Mervyn Parry
RIBA Royal Gold Medal – Jørn Utzon
Twenty-five Year Award – Eames House

Births
 Brian James Walker was born in Leith, Edinburgh on February. 17, 1978.

Deaths
 January 27 – Thomas Sharp, English urban planner (born 1901)
 March 1 – Léon Azéma, French architect (born 1888)
 April 9 – Clough Williams-Ellis, British architect (born 1883)
 August 21 – Charles Eames, American designer (born 1907)
 September 6 – Jo van den Broek, Dutch architect (born 1898)
 November 4 – Alfred Albini, Croatian architect and urban planner (born 1896)
 November 27 – Carlo Scarpa, Italian architect and designer (born 1906)

References

 
20th-century architecture